This is a list of German names for inhabited localities in Kaliningrad Oblast, Russia.

See also
List of cities and towns in East Prussia
German exonyms
List of European exonyms
East Prussia
History of Kaliningrad Oblast
Geography of Kaliningrad Oblast
Exonyms
Kaliningrad
Names of places in Russia